Acropora desalwii is a species of acroporid coral that was first described by Dr Carden Wallace in 1994. The species is rated as vulnerable on the IUCN Red List, with a decreasing population, and is affected by disease. It is common and found over a large area, and is listed under CITES Appendix II.

Description
Acropora desalwii forms in corymbose colonies consisting of crowded branches. The branchlets at the edge of the corymbose colonies are obvious, upward-facing, and can have over a single axial corallite, which are tube-shaped and long, and facing upwards. It is green, brown or blue in colour, and radial corallites are also present on the sides of the branchlets. It resembles Acropora parapharaonis and Acropora willisae. It is often kept in aquariums, where it reaches diameters of up to 25 cm.

Distribution
Acropora desalwii is common and found over a large area; the Solomon Islands and the Indo-Pacific, and it mainly occurs in Indonesia (two regions), Pohnpei, and the Philippines. It is native to Micronesia, Thailand, Australia, Malaysia, Indonesia, Papua New Guinea, the Solomon Islands, and Singapore. There is no known population for it, but the species is threatened by the decline of coral reefs, water temperatures increasing causing bleaching, disease, climate change, fishing, the acidification of oceans, pollution, invasive species, and Acanthaster planci. Some specimens could occur within Marine Protected Areas, it listed as a vulnerable species on the IUCN Red List as the population is decreasing, and is listed under Appendix II of CITES.

Taxonomy
It was first described by C. C. Wallace in 1994 in the Indo-Pacific as Acropora desalwii.

References

Acropora
Cnidarians of the Pacific Ocean
Marine fauna of Asia
Marine fauna of Oceania
Fauna of Southeast Asia
Vulnerable fauna of Asia
Vulnerable fauna of Oceania
Animals described in 1994